The Liberal Party, originally called Liberal Fusionist Party (PLF) until 1885, was a Spanish political party created in 1880 by Práxedes Mateo Sagasta. With the Conservative Party of Antonio Cánovas del Castillo, it formed a two-party system of alternating governments, the turno, which characterised the Spanish Restoration during the late 19th century and the early 20th century.

It combined republicans who did not accept the new law reflected in the Constitution of 1876 as well as monarchists, members of the Constitutional Party of general Francisco Serrano, of the Partido Radical of Manuel Ruiz Zorrilla, the “posibilistas” of Emilio Castelar and other military groupings.

Its political programme included achieving universal male suffrage, which was achieved in 1890; liberty of religious association; and the separation of powers. Although it could be classified as a dynastic party, its membership included at the start of the 20th century some politicians who would later become Republicans, such as Niceto Alcalá Zamora.

The system of political alternation characterising the Restoration began when Cánovas ceded power to Sagasta and he formed the first government of 8 February 1881, which started the first stage of the system that would see three liberal governments (two headed by Sagasta and one by José Posada).

The second stage began when the system was institutionalised and endorsed in 1885 when both parties signed the Pact of El Pardo, which established that the parties would alternate in power after the death of Alfonso XII of Spain, which was guaranteed by the caciques networks with which both parties were involved across Spain. The pact kept out of power radical ideologies like anarchism, socialism and republicanism, which could threaten the monarchic regime.
 
In 1898, the first split in the Liberal Party occurred by Germán Gamazo abandoning the party and leading a breakaway group (the gamacistas), which ended up merging with the Conservative Party. After Sagasta's death in 1903, a leadership contest occurred between Eugenio Montero Ríos and Segismundo Moret, which eventually led to José Canalejas leading the party. He tried to reform it and bring it closer to the reality of the country, but his attempts to evolve the party were cut short by his murder in 1912. That reopened a leadership struggle between two new protagonists, the Conde de Romanones and Manuel García Prieto, and led the party into a deep crisis, coinciding with the disintegration of the political system in which it had played a major part. The disintegration ended in 1931 with the dictatorship of Primo de Rivera and finally the monarchy of Alfonso XIII of Spain.

Party leaders 
 1876–1902: Práxedes Mateo Sagasta
 1902–1905: Eugenio Montero Ríos
 1905–1912: José Canalejas Méndez
 1912–1913: Segismundo Moret y Prendergast
 1913–1918: Conde de Romanones
 1918–1923: Manuel García-Prieto and Conde de Romanones
 1923–1930: Vacant (dictatorship of Miguel Primo de Rivera)
 1931: Conde de Romanones.

See also
Liberal Conservative Party

References

 
Liberal parties in Spain
Restoration (Spain)
Defunct political parties in Spain
Political parties established in 1880
1880 establishments in Spain